Jaan Koort (6 November 1883, Sootaga Parish (Äksi), Tartu – 14 October 1935 in Moscow) was an Estonian sculptor, painter and ceramicist.

Born on 6 November in Tartu, he was the thirteenth child of village farmers Susanna-Marie and Jaan Koort. He studied at Orge village school. During the period from 1896 to 1900 he studied at the Tartu city school. In 1901, he participated in the German Craftsmen Society's drawing courses. His studies continued at the Saint Petersburg Stieglitz State Academy of Art and Design (1902–1905), where he studied painting and sculpture. During the Revolution of 1905 he left St. Petersburg, and later moved back to Estonia, then later to Finland, and from there to Paris.

References

External links
 Hanno Kompus, Mida tõi Koort meie skulptuuri?, Looming nr. 5/1935
 Raimu Hanson.  Kunstimuuseum ostis Jaan Koorti õlimaali Tartu Postimees, 5 January 2009
 Jaanus Piirsalu. Jaan Koort tegi Vene kuulsat portselani EPL, 7 February 2009

1883 births
1935 deaths
People from Tartu Parish
People from the Governorate of Livonia
20th-century Estonian painters
20th-century Estonian sculptors
20th-century Estonian male artists
Burials at Rahumäe Cemetery